Iolaus bolissus is a butterfly in the family Lycaenidae. It is found in Cameroon, Gabon, the Republic of the Congo, the Democratic Republic of the Congo, Uganda, Kenya and Zambia. The habitat consists of forests.

The larvae feed on Englerina woodfordioides and Tapinanthus dependens.

Subspecies
Iolaus bolissus bolissus (Gabon, Congo, Democratic Republic of the Congo, Zambia)
Iolaus bolissus aurora Clench, 1964 (Uganda, western Kenya)
Iolaus bolissus azureus Clench, 1964 (Cameroon)

References

External links

Die Gross-Schmetterlinge der Erde 13: Die Afrikanischen Tagfalter. Plate XIII 69 a, b

Butterflies described in 1873
Iolaus (butterfly)
Butterflies of Africa
Taxa named by William Chapman Hewitson